The Laforge-1 is a hydroelectric power station on the Laforge River, a tributary of the La Grande River, and is part of Hydro-Québec's James Bay Project. Commissioned in 1993–1994, it generates up to 878 megawatts through the reservoir and dam system.

See also 

 List of largest power stations in Canada
 Reservoirs and dams in Canada

External links 
 Hydro-Québec's La Grande Complex
 La Grande System
 Laforge-1

James Bay Project
Dams in Quebec
Dams completed in 1994
Dams on the Laforge River
Publicly owned dams in Canada